The 2020 United States presidential election in Arkansas took place on Tuesday, November 3, 2020, as part of the 2020 United States presidential election in which all 50 states plus the District of Columbia participated. Arkansas voters chose six electors to represent them in the Electoral College via a popular vote pitting incumbent Republican President Donald Trump and his running mate, incumbent Vice President Mike Pence, against Democratic challenger and former Vice President Joe Biden and his running mate, United States Senator Kamala Harris of California. Also on the ballot were the nominees for the Libertarian, Green, Constitution, American Solidarity, Life and Liberty, and Socialism and Liberation parties and Independent candidates. Write-in candidates are not allowed to participate in presidential elections.

Prior to the election, all 14 news organizations making predictions considered this a state Trump would win, or otherwise a safe red state. In 2016, Trump won Arkansas by a 26.92% margin, the largest margin for a candidate of either party since Jimmy Carter's 30.01% margin in 1976. In 2020, Trump won 62.40% of the vote to Biden's 34.78%, a 27.62% margin, the seventh consecutive election in which Republicans improved on their margin in Arkansas, the longest in the nation of any state for either party. This made Arkansas one of only seven states, along with the District of Columbia, in which Trump improved on his performance in 2016. This margin makes it the largest loss by a Democrat in Arkansas since George McGovern's 38.1-point defeat in 1972. The last Democrat even to win over 40% of the vote was John Kerry in 2004. After Barack Obama, Biden is the second ever Democrat to win the presidency without carrying Arkansas. 

Trump won landslide margins across the state, including in many of the state's metropolitan areas and suburbs. Trump once again carried Woodruff County, formerly a Democratic stronghold, thus marking the first time since its founding that a Democratic was elected president without carrying the county. Biden's strength was mostly isolated to Pulaski County, home to the state capital and largest city of Little Rock, and Jefferson County, home to Pine Bluff. He also won six rural, predominantly African-American counties on the eastern border along the Mississippi River. All but seven counties in the state swung heavily to the right, with the exceptions being Pulaski County and two other counties in the Little Rock metropolitan area; Sebastian County, home to Fort Smith; and three counties in the northwest encompassing and surrounding the college town of Fayetteville, where the University of Arkansas is located. Notably, Biden lost Washington County, where Fayetteville is, by only 3.9 percentage points, the closest any Democrat has come to winning it since Clinton did so in 1996. Arkansas voted 32.07% more Republican than the national average in 2020.

Primary elections
The primary elections were held on Super Tuesday, March 3, 2020.

Republican primary
Incumbent President Donald Trump, former Massachusetts Governor Bill Weld, and perennial candidate Rocky De La Fuente were the declared Republicans candidates. Tom Cotton, the current junior senator from Arkansas, declined to run in 2017. As incumbent presidents rarely face prominent challenges in primaries, Trump won all 40 delegates and 97.13% of the vote.

Democratic primary
Eighteen candidates were on the Democratic primary ballot, of whom nine had already withdrew, three withdrew during the early voting period, and six were active candidates. Former Vice President Joe Biden won the primary with 40.59% of the vote and 17 delegates; he carried all but one county. Senator Bernie Sanders of Vermont came in second place, with 22.44% of the vote and 9 delegates. Former New York City Mayor Michael Bloomberg won 16.72% of the vote and 5 delegates; no other candidates won over 15% of the vote or any delegates. Biden's win was widely predicted in polling and forecasts, similar to most other southern states; his best performance was along the eastern border along the Mississippi River and on the southern border, which have high concentrations of African American voters, who Biden consistently performed better among throughout the primary. He also won the Little Rock, Fort Smith, Jonesboro, and Pine Bluff metropolitan areas. Analogous with his performance in the 2016 primary, Sanders performed best in the northwest, traditionally the most Republican part of the state, holding Biden to less than 40 percent of the vote in many regions and winning Washington County, home to the University of Arkansas in Fayetteville. Biden's strong performance in the state is a vestige of the prominence of moderate, white, Democratic politicians in and from the state throughout the late 20th century and 2000s which has largely faded amid increased political polarization and Republican gains among white, non-college-educated voters. Aided by several other centrist candidates withdrawing from the race just before Super Tuesday and a growing Democratic voter base in the suburbs, Arkansas was a relatively noncompetitive state throughout the primary.

General election

Predictions

Polling

Graphical summary

Aggregate polls

Polls

Fundraising
According to the Federal Election Commission, in 2019 and 2020, Donald Trump and his interest groups raised $2,732,436.64, Joe Biden and his interest groups raised $2,088,712.78, and Jo Jorgensen and her interest groups raised $5,289.19 from Arkansas-based contributors.

Candidate ballot access
The candidates on the ballot were listed in the following order:

 Jo Jorgensen / Spike Cohen, Libertarian
 Kanye West / Michelle Tidball, Independent
 Brock Pierce / Karla Ballard, Independent
 Brian T. Carroll / Amar Patel, American Solidarity
 Howie Hawkins / Angela Nicole Walker, Green
 C. L. Gammon / Phil Collins, Independent
 Gloria La Riva / Sunil Freeman, Socialism and Liberation
 John Richard Myers / Tiara Lusk, Life and Liberty
 Don Blankenship / William Mohr, Constitution

 Joe Biden / Kamala Harris, Democratic
 Rocky De La Fuente / Darcy G. Richardson, Independent
 Donald Trump / Mike Pence, Republican

Political party candidates were eligible via a primary election or party convention and had to have filed an affidavit of eligibility, political practices pledge, and party certificate with the Arkansas Secretary of State by March 1, 2020, as did independent candidates. Independents also had to file a petition with at least 1,000 signatures of eligible voters from up to 90 days before the petition filing deadline on August 3, 2020. Write-in candidates cannot run in presidential, municipal, or primary elections.

Electoral slates
Technically the voters of Arkansas cast their ballots for electors, or representatives to the Electoral College, rather than directly for president and vice president. Arkansas is allocated six electors because it has four congressional districts and two senators. All candidates who appear on the ballot must submit a list of six electors who pledge to vote for their candidate and their running mate. Whoever wins the most votes in the state is awarded all six electoral votes. Their chosen electors then vote for president and vice president. Although electors are pledged to their candidate and running mate, they are not obligated to vote for them. An elector who votes for someone other than their candidate is known as a faithless elector. In the state of Arkansas, there are no laws regarding faithless electors, meaning their vote is counted and not penalized.

The electors of each state and the District of Columbia met on December 15, 2020, to cast their votes for president and vice president. All six pledged electors cast their votes for incumbent President Donald Trump and Vice President Mike Pence. The Electoral College itself never meets as one body. Instead, the electors from each state and the District of Columbia met in their respective capitols. The electoral vote was tabulated and certified by Congress in a joint session on January 6, 2021, per the Electoral Count Act.

These electors were nominated by each party in order to vote in the Electoral College should their candidate win the state:

Results

Statewide results

By county

By congressional district

Analysis
Arkansas is a majority-White Southern state with a strong distaste for social liberalism, contained entirely within the Bible Belt. As a result, no Democrat has won Arkansas since native son and former governor Bill Clinton did so in 1996; since then, the Republican margin of victory has increased in every consecutive presidential election. The state thoroughly ceased to be competitive in 2008, when Democrat Barack Obama lost Arkansas by nearly 20 points despite decisively winning the national election. This marked a historic shift in the state; Obama became the first Democrat ever elected president without carrying Arkansas.

Continuing on this trend, Trump carried the Natural State again by a margin of 27.62%, a 0.7% increase from 26.92% four years earlier in 2016. Even as most of the nation swung slightly leftward, many counties in Arkansas still swung dramatically rightward. Trump improved his margin in the historically Democratic Delta county of Woodruff from 8.9% four years prior to 27.7%. in 2020.

Biden's main bases of support were in Pulaski County (Little Rock), Jefferson County (Pine Bluff), and most of the counties along the Mississippi River. Despite his statewide loss, Biden shrank Trump's margin in Washington County—a northwest Arkansas county home to Fayetteville and in turn the University of Arkansas—from 9.9% to 3.9%.

Per exit polls by the Associated Press, Trump's strength in Arkansas came from 86% with White, born again/evangelical Christians. Fifty-two percent of voters opposed changing the Arkansas state flag to remove the star that symbolizes the Confederacy, and these voters backed Trump by 88%–10%.

In other elections, incumbent Republican Tom Cotton defeated Libertarian Ricky Dale Harrington Jr. in the senatorial election by 33 points, outperforming Trump. Harrington's performance is the best Libertarian senatorial performance in history in terms of voting percentage. No Democrat filed in the senatorial race.

Notes

See also
 United States presidential elections in Arkansas
 2020 Arkansas elections
 2020 United States presidential election
 2020 Democratic Party presidential primaries
 2020 Republican Party presidential primaries
 2020 United States elections

References

Further reading
 
 https://www.arkansasonline.com:443/news/2020/sep/02/election-presents-multiple-choices/
 https://www.arkansasonline.com:443/news/2021/feb/08/election-cost-county-128357/?elections

External links
 
 
  (state affiliate of the U.S. League of Women Voters)
 

Arkansas
2020
Presidential